Newtown is a borough in Bucks County, Pennsylvania, United States. The population was 2,268 at the 2020 census. It is located just west of the Trenton, New Jersey metropolitan area, and is part of the larger Philadelphia metropolitan area. It is entirely surrounded by Newtown Township, from which it separated in 1838. State Street is the main commercial thoroughfare with wide sidewalks, shops, taverns, and restaurants.

History 
Newtown was founded by William Penn in 1684.  Newtown was one of several towns that Penn had organized around Philadelphia to provide country homes for city residents and to support farming communities. It was the county seat of Bucks County from 1726 until 1813, when it was replaced by a more central Doylestown. After his December 26, 1776 morning march to Trenton, and before the Battle of Princeton, General George Washington made his headquarters in Newtown. Newtown was incorporated on April 16, 1838 and has been enlarged three times since. In 1969 Newtown's entire central business district was placed on the National Register of Historic Places. This designation was largely due to Newtown's historic clock tower. Newtown is enhanced by unique boutiques, colleges, cuisine, a climate for industry, Pennsylvania's most popular state park (Tyler State Park) and a Heritage Walk that traces the very steps of George Washington. The Law School Admission Council is headquartered in Newtown Township. As a result, many American lawyers have heard of Newtown. The oldest operating movie theater in America is Newtown Theatre at 120 North State Street.

Newtown is known for its wealth of history. One of the most noted former residents of Newtown was painter Edward Hicks. He lived in Newtown for over forty years with his family, where he was able to own his own business. Newtown has an established historical society called the Newtown Historic Association.

The Newtown Hardware House has been in continuous operation for over 130 years, which ranks as the longest tenure for any single business in Newtown.

The Half-Moon Inn, Newtown Creek Bridge, Newtown Friends Meetinghouse and Cemetery, Newtown Historic District, Newtown Presbyterian Church, and George F. Tyler Mansion are listed on the National Register of Historic Places.

Geography
According to the United States Census Bureau, the borough has a total area of 0.6 square mile (1.4 km²), all  land.

The Newtown Creek, a tributary of the Neshaminy Creek, flows south along the western boundary between the borough and the township of Newtown.

Climate
According to the Köppen climate classification system, Newtown has a Humid subtropical climate (Cfa). Cfa climates are characterized by all months having an average mean temperature > , at least four months with an average mean temperature ≥ , at least one month with an average mean temperature ≥  and no significant precipitation difference between seasons. Although most summer days are slightly humid in Newtown, episodes of heat and high humidity can occur, with heat index values > . The average wettest month is July, which corresponds with the annual peak in thunderstorm activity. Episodes of extreme cold and wind can occur, with wind chill values < . Ice storms and large snowstorms depositing ≥  of snow occur once every few years, particularly during nor’easters from December through February.

Ecology
The spring bloom typically begins by April 8 and fall color usually peaks by November 2.

Demographics

As of the 2010 census, the borough was 95.3% Non-Hispanic White, 0.8% Black or African American, 0.2% Native American, 1.2% Asian, and 1.2% were two or more races. 1.2% of the population were of Hispanic or Latino ancestry.

As of the census of 2000, there were 2,312 people, 920 households, and 595 families residing in the borough. The population density was 4,201.6 people per square mile (1,623.0/km²). There were 936 housing units at an average density of 1,701.0 per square mile (657.1/km²). The racial makeup of the borough was 96.93% White, 1.12% African American, 0.09% Native American, 0.74% Asian, 0.17% from other races, and 0.95% from two or more races. Hispanic or Latino of any race were 0.95% of the population.

There were 920 households, out of which 28.3% had children under the age of 18 living with them, 54.9% were married couples living together, 7.8% had a female householder with no husband present, and 35.3% were non-families. 29.9% of all households were made up of individuals, and 7.9% had someone living alone who was 65 years of age or older. The average household size was 2.35 and the average family size was 2.95.

In the borough the population was spread out, with 21.8% under the age of 18, 6.1% from 18 to 24, 28.2% from 25 to 44, 27.8% from 45 to 64, and 16.0% who were 65 years of age or older. The median age was 41 years. For every 100 females there were 82.2 males. For every 100 females age 18 and over, there were 80.0 males.

The median income for a household in the borough was $63,571, and the median income for a family was $78,215. Males had a median income of $54,231 versus $37,283 for females. The per capita income for the borough was $33,500. About 0.7% of families and 3.4% of the population were below the poverty line, including 1.5% of those under age 18 and 5.0% of those age 65 or over.

Parks and recreation
Newtown Township, which surrounds the borough, has a system of bike and walking trails that lead to the borough in several places, including from Tyler State Park.

Education 
Newtown is in the Council Rock School District. While the district serves many towns in Lower Bucks County, Newtown Township is home to Council Rock High School North, Newtown Middle School (formerly Newtown Junior High), Goodnoe Elementary School, Newtown Elementary School, and the former Chancellor Street School, which now acts as the administrative building for the district. The only private school in the township is St. Andrews Catholic Education Center. George School, though associated with Newtown, is mostly in Middletown Township, and Newtown Friends School, though it bears Newtown's name, is located entirely in Middletown Township. The township is also the site of Bucks County Community College's main campus. La Salle University and Holy Family University also have satellite campuses on the Newtown Bypass.

Infrastructure

Transportation

Highways

State Street runs through Newtown's main commercial area and intersects with Washington Avenue at the borough's infrastructural center.
Pennsylvania Routes 532, 332, and 413 pass outside the borough in surrounding areas of Newtown Township via the Newtown Bypass.

Passenger trains

Until January 14, 1983, Newtown was served by SEPTA's Fox Chase/Newtown Line commuter rail service. At that time, service was suspended because of failing train equipment. Since then, there has been constant talk of reinstating service because of recent strong population growth in the surrounding area; however, this has not materialized. There was also a movement under way to convert the unused rail corridor into a bike trail that has thus far been unsuccessful because of resistance in surrounding communities.

To date, SEPTA has no plans to restore train service. The entire issue of resuming commuter service has been a political albatross almost from the day the trains stopped. Newtown remains the victim in all the political squabbling that has amassed over the years, as they have always given strong support of returned commuter service and have the most to gain. Author Joseph Schwieterman commented in 2001 that "few communities experiencing the loss of service have engaged in as protracted a dialogue about bringing back their passenger trains as Newtown. The continuing impasse has left many transit advocates skeptical that the borough will ever be accessible by rail again."

However, in September 2009, the Southampton-based Pennsylvania Transit Expansion Coalition (PA-TEC) began discussions with all townships along the rail line, as well as SEPTA officials, about possible resumption of passenger service. Bucks County officials and Newtown residents overwhelmingly supported PA-TEC's efforts, making it official in December 2009 when the Newtown Board of Supervisors passed a resolution supporting the full restoration of passenger service; neighboring Montgomery County officials are also supportive of re-thinking the rail corridor as well.

Toll Brothers built the "Newtown Station" development east of the station site.

The nearest station to Newtown is Woodbourne station on SEPTA's  West Trenton Line.

Bus
SEPTA currently serves Newtown with SEPTA Suburban Bus Route 130, which runs to nearby Bucks County Community College and south to the Langhorne station along SEPTA Regional Rail's West Trenton Line and Frankford Avenue and Knights Road in Northeast Philadelphia.

Notable person
 Peter Baltes, musician

References

External links

Borough of Newtown

Populated places established in 1684
Boroughs in Bucks County, Pennsylvania
1684 establishments in Pennsylvania